This is a list of FCC-licensed community radio stations in the United States.

 ⚠️ New station (WRLN) added on March 8, 2023

See also

List of Pacifica Radio stations and affiliates

References

 
C